Abismoj is a 1923 novel written by Jean Forge, the first he wrote originally in Esperanto.  It describes and profoundly analyzes conflicts in the soul.  Already there appear the greatest strengths of Forge's work, the original form, the figures themselves speak about themselves and about their problems; the form and the inventive narration style give this work important significance in Esperanto literature.

The core of this novel is a daily repeating story, but Forge is able with his masterful pen to make it interesting to the last word ... Strikingly clear style, popularly deep psychology and in absolutely classical Esperanto. (Jobo, Literatura Mondo 1923, p. 140).

Contents 

Ernesto Muŝko (pron. Mushko) behaved badly and spent his wealth.  A means of salvation suddenly appears: to marry Halino Borki, the sole daughter of a rich neighbor who through boredom and a yearning for love at first accepts his proposal.  Mateo Ardo, an orphan, has been educated with Zonjo, and they get engaged. But Mateo by chance, having arrived at Mr. Borki's house, appeals to his daughter and is almost seduced by her.  Muŝko burns his house in despair, while Mateo manages to escape from the sinful passion and return to his first love.

Main characters 
Ernesto Muŝko, country estate owner in Karlovo
Halino Borki, daughter of a neighboring country estate owner in Nivi
Mateo Ardo, art painter
Zonjo Biringo, his fiancée

Adaptation for the theater 

The novel was adapted by Arno Lagrange for the theater under the title Trajna sonĝo (~Train dream) and offered for an international production at the 72nd World Convention of Esperanto in Warsaw in 1987. The production however did not take place.

Sources 

The first version of this article is a translation from the article "Abismoj" in Esperanto Wikipedia.

Index

 The First Period 1887-1920 Primitive Romanticism and the Establishment of Style 21
 Mature Romanticism and a Literary Flowering 73
 Parnassianism and the Coming of Age 159
 PostParnassianism and Modernism 237
 Popularization of the Novel Experimental Poetry Postmodernism 403
 Outline of Esperantos Linguistic Outline of Esperantos Linguistic Outline of Esperantos Linguistic Outline of Esperantos Linguistic Outline of Espera 577
 The Structure of Esperanto 580
 Specimen Literary Texts 585
 Vocabulary to the Specimen Literary Texts 594
 General Bibliography including sources 603
 Cited Translations from Original Esperanto Literature 661
 Esperanto Culturesummary 671
 Libraries and further information 673
 Index 675

Esperanto novels
1923 German novels
Esperanto in Germany
Novels by Jean Forge